Holmcroft is the name of a Stafford, Staffordshire, England, residential estate approximately 1½ miles north of Stafford town centre, situated in a geographic area long recorded as "Tillington, Staffordshire." Holmcroft is also a Ward of Stafford Borough Council. Holmcroft Road was the name chosen by the council for the street that connects the residential area to the A34 Stone Road.  Thus Holmcroft or Holmcroft Estate became part of the postal address. Even for estate homes not located on Holmcroft Road. The name means "croft by the island", from Old Norse holmr "island" and Old English croft "croft". The name was recorded as Holimcroft in 1183.

The original Holmcroft Estate of private houses was built just before the war: c. 1934-39. A later phase, constructed c. 1946-49, known as Wimpey homes, after the name of the company that built them, were originally council owned. Many of the properties have since been sold by the council to private owners. For many years, the local infants school on Young Avenue was Holmcroft Primary School, later to be named Tillington Manor Primary School. There is a family pub on Holmcroft Road called The Holmcroft and a small shopping precinct nearby with a Co-op, barbers, pharmacy, Coral bookmakers, laundrette and library.

A large hotel Tillington Hall Hotel was situated close-by on A5013 Eccleshall Road. It was demolished in 2021-22. The land is now planned to be used for a new housing project.

Saint Bertelins Anglican church is also nearby.

See also
 Creswell, Staffordshire

References

Stafford